My Baby may refer to:

Songs
 "My Baby" (Bow Wow song), 2003
 "My Baby" (Cold Chisel song), 1980
 "My Baby" (Kállay Saunders song), 2012
 "My Baby" (Lil' Romeo song), 2001
 "My Baby" (Lil Skies song), 2021
 "My Baby" (Pretenders song), 1987
 "My Baby" (The Temptations song), 1965
 "My Baby", by Britney Spears from Circus, 2008
 "My Baby", by Janet Jackson from Damita Jo, 2004
 "My Baby", by Janis Joplin from Pearl, 1971
 "My Baby", by Jesse McCartney from Departure, 2008
 "My Baby...", by Juliana Hatfield from How to Walk Away, 2008
 "My Baby", by Pieter T, 2011
 "My Baby", by Zendaya from Zendaya, 2013
 "My Baby (He's Something Else)", by Irene Cara from Anyone Can See, 1982
 "My Baby (My Baby My Own)", by Diana Ross from Touch Me in the Morning, 1973

Other uses
 My Baby (band), a Dutch-New Zealand band
 My Baby (film), a 1912 comedy short directed by D. W. Griffith
 My Baby (series), a series of single-player virtual life simulation video games

See also
 Be My Baby (disambiguation)
 She's My Baby (disambiguation)
 There Goes My Baby (disambiguation)